Kemekafo  is a commune in the Cercle of Dioïla in the Koulikoro Region of south-western Mali. The principal town lies at Senou. As of 1998 the commune had a population of 16,970.

References

Communes of Koulikoro Region